Lake Suzy is an unincorporated community in DeSoto County, Florida, United States.

Known mainly for golf and freshwater fishing in the many small ponds connected to the golf course. Lake Suzy is also home to a private airport, in which a grass airstrip is maintained and utilized by the few residents with air hangars and private planes on property. There are three main sections of this area, including the estates near the airport on SW Austin Blvd, the condos around SW Egret Circle and SW Kingsway Circle, and the family sized houses located near Pembroke Circle, which is a deed restricted community within Lake Suzy.

Non-Residential Establishments 

Throughout Lake Suzy, there are only 4 establishments. These include Faith Preparatory School, which previously was opened as Community Green Charter School and Laurel Oaks Academy Private School, the Lake Suzy Water Treatment Plant owned and operated by DeSoto County Utilities, the family-owned Marathon Gas Station and convenience store, and Kingsway Golf Club.

References

Unincorporated communities in DeSoto County, Florida
Unincorporated communities in Florida